Aristolochia goldieana is a species of plant in the family Aristolochiaceae. It is found in Benin, Cameroon, Ghana, Guinea, Guinea-Bissau, the Gulf of Guinea Islands, Ivory Coast, Liberia, Nigeria, and Sierra Leone. Its natural habitat is subtropical or tropical moist lowland forests. It is threatened by habitat loss.

References

External links
 

goldieana
Flora of Benin
Flora of Cameroon
Flora of Ghana
Flora of Guinea
Flora of Guinea-Bissau
Flora of the Gulf of Guinea islands
Flora of Ivory Coast
Flora of Liberia
Flora of Nigeria
Flora of Sierra Leone
Vulnerable plants
Taxonomy articles created by Polbot